The War Ministry (Ministério da Guerra) was the government department responsible for the administration of the Portuguese Army. In 1950 it was renamed Army Ministry (Ministério do Exército). The Army Ministry was disbanded in 1974, when it was replaced by the Ministry of National Defence.

Portuguese Army
Military of Portugal